The Guidelines for the Definition of Managed Objects (GDMO) is a specification for defining managed objects of interest to the Telecommunications Management Network for use in CMIP.

GDMO to the Structure of Management Information for defining a management information base for SNMP.  For example, both represent a hierarchy of managed objects and use ASN.1 for syntax.

GDMO is defined in ISO/IEC 10165 and ITU-T X.722.

Network management
ITU-T recommendations
ITU-T G Series Recommendations